

1873–74 season

The 1873–74 season was the first season of competitive football by Kilmarnock.

Overview

As founder members of the Scottish FA, Kilmarnock were one of 16 teams to enter the first edition of the Scottish Cup in 1873. They were involved in the first ever match in the competition when they took on Renton at the neutral Hampden Park in Glasgow on 18 October 1873. Killie - who played the entire match with 10 men - were not used to playing under association rules and lost 2–0.

During the club's early years, the team would play in Oxford blue shirts, white shorts and Oxford blue socks. The now traditional blue and white vertical stripes weren't introduced until 1896.

Scottish Cup

Friendlies

1874–75 season

The 1874–75 season was the second season of competitive football by Kilmarnock.

Overview
Kilmarnock entered the Scottish Cup for the second time. They bettered their previous performance in the competition after a 4–0 win at home to Vale of Leven Rovers in the first round. However, they then lost 3–0 at The Grange to Eastern in the second round.

Scottish Cup

Friendlies

1875–76 season

The 1875–76 season was the third season of competitive football by Kilmarnock.

Overview
Kilmarnock entered the Scottish Cup for the third time. They equalled their previous best performance in the competition after an 8–0 win at home to Ayr Eglinton in the first round. However, they then lost 6–0 at Kinning Park to Clydesdale in the second round.

Scottish Cup

1876–77 season

The 1876–77 season was the fourth season of competitive football by Kilmarnock.

Overview
Kilmarnock entered the Scottish Cup for the fourth time. They equalled their previous best performance in the competition after receiving a bye in the first round. However, they then lost 2–1 at Holm Quarry to Mauchline in the second round.

Scottish Cup

1877–78 season

The 1877–78 season was the fifth season of competitive football by Kilmarnock.

Overview
Kilmarnock entered the Scottish Cup for the fifth time and competed in the inaugural Ayrshire Cup. They equalled their previous best performance in the Scottish Cup after a 5–1 win at home to Hurlford in the first round. However, they then lost 1–0 at Springvale Park to Ayr Academicals in the second round. Killie also reached the second round of the Ayrshire Cup where they lost 4–1 to Mauchline.

Scottish Cup

Ayrshire Cup

1878–79 season

The 1878–79 season was the sixth season of competitive football by Kilmarnock.

Overview
Kilmarnock entered the Scottish Cup for the sixth time and also competed in the Ayrshire Cup. In both competitions, they were knocked out in the first round, losing 2–0 to Kilbirnie in the Scottish Cup and 7–0 to Mauchline in the Ayrshire Cup.

Scottish Cup

Ayrshire Cup

Friendlies

1879–80 season

The 1879–80 season was the seventh season of competitive football by Kilmarnock.

Overview
Kilmarnock entered the Scottish Cup for the seventh time and also competed in the Ayrshire Cup. They equalled their previous best performance in the Scottish Cup after a walkover victory against Ayr Academicals in the first round. However, they then lost 6–2 at Connell Park to Mauchline in the second round. Killie bettered their previous best performance in the Ayrshire Cup after they defeated Ayr Athole and Kilmarnock Arthurlie to reach the third round where they lost 1–0 to Kilmarnock Portland.

Scottish Cup

Ayrshire Cup

Notes
Notes

References

1873
1873–74 in Scottish football
1874–75 in Scottish football
1875–76 in Scottish football
1876–77 in Scottish football
1877–78 in Scottish football
1878–79 in Scottish football
1879–80 in Scottish football
Scottish football clubs 1873–74 season
Scottish football clubs 1874–75 season
Scottish football clubs 1875–76 season
Scottish football clubs 1876–77 season
Scottish football clubs 1877–78 season
Scottish football clubs 1878–79 season
Scottish football clubs 1879–80 season